Tairong Petchtiam (Thai ไตรรงค์ เพ็ชรเทียม), simply known as Deng (Thai เด้ง) is a Thai futsal Ala (winger), and a member of  Thailand national futsal team in 2016 FIFA Futsal World Cup. He plays for Surat Thani Futsal Club in Futsal Thailand League.

International career
Under Miguel Rodrigo, Tairong was called for Thailand national futsal team for the first time for 2016 Thailand Five's. He made the official debut on 20 August 2016 against Japan. He also scored a goal in his debut.

References

Tairong Petchtiam
1993 births
Living people
Tairong Petchtiam